Andrzej Pitynski (15 March 1947, Ulanów – 18 September 2020, Mount Holly, New Jersey) was a Polish-American monumental sculptor who lived and worked in the United States. 
A book of his works was published in 2008.

Work

The Partisans

In January, 2006, his Partisans (1979) was removed from the corner of Beacon and Charles streets on the Boston Common, where it had stood since 1983. Although it was originally destined for Warsaw, the work – which depicts guerrilla Polish freedom fighters in World War II – was not welcomed in communist Poland at that time.  On September 6, 2006, the work was moved to the MBTA's Silver-Line World Trade Center Station on the South Boston waterfront. It was permanently relocated to the center median of D Street, at the intersection with Congress Street, on November 17, 2018. 

Describing his "Partisans" Pitynski said, that he dedicated this monument to all "Fighters for Freedom in the World", and used Polish Partisans as an example.

Katyn Memorials
Pitynski has worked on a number of works remembering the Katyn massacre including the Katyn Memorial which stands in Exchange Place in Jersey City, New Jersey and the National Katyń Memorial which stands in the Inner Harbor in Baltimore.

Volhynian slaughter memorial
The memorial to the victims of the Volhynian slaughter, commissioned by the Polish Army Veterans' Association in America, designed by Andrzej Pityński in 2017, after casting in bronze will be erected in the National Memory Park in Toruń, Poland.

Andrzej Pitynski on monuments

References

 The Partisans in Boston, An Epilogue, Doomed Soldiers 1944–1963, The Untold Story

1947 births
2020 deaths
Polish sculptors
Polish male sculptors